Zoltán Uray (born 23 September 1931) is a Romanian fencer. He competed in the individual épée event at the 1952 Summer Olympics.

References

External links
 

1931 births
Living people
Romanian male épée fencers
Olympic fencers of Romania
Fencers at the 1952 Summer Olympics
Romanian sportspeople of Hungarian descent
Sportspeople from Cluj-Napoca